Kancab is a town in the Tekax Municipality, Yucatán in Mexico. As of 2010, the town has a population of 2,819.

Demographics

References

Populated places in Yucatán